Aaron Wright (born 22 January 1997) is an Irish cricketer. He made his first-class debut for Northern Knights in the 2018 Inter-Provincial Championship on 17 July 2018.

References

External links
 

1997 births
Living people
Irish cricketers
Northern Knights cricketers
Place of birth missing (living people)